Myrcia subterminalis is a species of plant in the family Myrtaceae, endemic to the east of Brazil, and first described in 2015.

Etymology 
The species name refers to the plant's subterminal clusters of flowers.

Description 
Myrcia subterminalis is a tree that grows to between 3 and 15 metres tall. Leaves grow up to 14.5cm long and 5.9cm wide. Fruits are red with translucent spots, and  up to 7mm wide, with up to 2 seeds.

Distribution 
This plant is found in mountain atlantic forests and semideciduous forests in Alagoas, Bahia, Espírito Santo, and Minas Gerais.

Conservation status 
Myrcia subterminalis is considered to be vulnerable due to its distribution and threatened habitat.

References 

subterminalis
Tropical fruit
Flora of South America
Endemic flora of Brazil
Fruits originating in South America
Fruit trees
Berries
Plants described in 2015